The LucasArts Archives are a series of CD-ROM personal computer game re-releases and compilations from publisher LucasArts.

List of LucasArts Archives
 The LucasArts Archives Vol. I (1995)
 Indiana Jones and the Fate of Atlantis
 Maniac Mansion: Day of the Tentacle
 Sam & Max Hit the Road
 Star Wars Screen Entertainment desktop utility
 Star Wars: Rebel Assault (3 level demo)
 LucasArts Super Sampler disc featuring demos of Full Throttle, Star Wars: Dark Forces, Star Wars: Rebel Assault II: The Hidden Empire, and Star Wars: TIE Fighter Collector's Edition CD-ROM.
 The LucasArts Macintosh Archives Vol. I (1996)
 Indiana Jones and the Fate of Atlantis
 Maniac Mansion: Day of the Tentacle
 Sam & Max Hit the Road
 Star Wars: Rebel Assault
 Star Wars: Dark Forces (3 level demo)
 LucasArts Super Sampler disc featuring demos of Full Throttle, Star Wars: X-Wing, Star Wars: Rebel Assault II: The Hidden Empire, The Dig, and Mortimer and the Riddles of the Medallion.
 The LucasArts Archives Vol. II: The Star Wars Collection (1996) was released as part of Lucasfilm's promotion of the then-upcoming expanded theatrical re-releases of the original Star Wars trilogy. The Star Wars Collection contained:
 Star Wars: Rebel Assault
 Star Wars: Rebel Assault II: The Hidden Empire
 Star Wars: TIE Fighter Collector's Edition CD-ROM
 Star Wars: Dark Forces (demo)
 Star Wars: Making Magic (Multimedia CD-ROM featuring a behind-the-scenes look at the new versions of the Star Wars films)
 The LucasArts Archives Vol. III (1997)
 Afterlife
 The Dig
 Full Throttle
 Monkey Island Madness (a compilation disc of The Secret of Monkey Island and Monkey Island 2: LeChuck's Revenge)
 Star Wars: Dark Forces
 LucasArts Super Sampler 2 disc featuring demos of The Curse of Monkey Island, Indiana Jones and His Desktop Adventures, Outlaws, Star Wars Jedi Knight: Dark Forces II, Star Wars: X-Wing vs. TIE Fighter, and Star Wars: Yoda Stories.
 The LucasArts Archives Vol. IV: The Star Wars Collection II (1998)
 Star Wars: Dark Forces
 Star Wars: TIE Fighter Collector's Edition CD-ROM
 Star Wars: X-Wing Collector's Edition CD-ROM
 Star Wars: Yoda Stories
 Star Wars: Making Magic (same as from the first Star Wars Collection)
 Demo disc of Star Wars Jedi Knight: Dark Forces II, Star Wars: Jedi Knight: Mysteries of the Sith, and Star Wars: X-Wing vs. TIE Fighter.

Later games published under the LucasArts Archives brand were budget-priced reissues of individual games, with the exception of Monkey Island Archives, which was a compilation of The Secret of Monkey Island, Monkey Island 2: LeChuck's Revenge, and The Curse of Monkey Island, released with The Curse of Monkey Island'''s box art.

Many of the games that were released in these Archive collections are not directly compatible with modern operating systems, but can still be played using the ScummVM software.

ReceptionThe LucasArts Macintosh Archives Vol. I'' was the top-selling Macintosh game for March, April, and May 1997, selling over 15,000 units over those three months.

References

1995 video games
LucasArts games
Star Wars video games
Video game compilations